Chenab College Jhang is a public college in Jhang, Punjab, Pakistan. It was established on self-help basis in 1991.

Colleges in this group 
 Chenab College Chiniot
 Chenab College Shorkot
 Chenab College Athara Hazari
 Chenab College Ahmed Pur Sial

Buildings 
The duration of full course is 14 years starting from class Nursery. Students are prepared for Secondary School Certificate, Intermediate, O’ Level and A’ Level by Cambridge Assessment International Education (CAIE). The normal curriculum of the institution includes English, Urdu, Islamic studies, Pakistan studies, mathematics, physics, chemistry, biology and computer science. The choice of each student is carefully adjusted to his/her ability and aptitude, as well as to the future career which he/she has in view. 
The medium of instruction is purely English.

Board of trustees (Jhang Educational Trust) 
Jhang Educational Trust is the monitoring authority of all the Chenab Colleges (Jhang, Shorkot, Ahmed Pur Sial and Athara Hazari) and is responsible to approve major decisions relating to all matters of the institutions. Deputy Commissioner Jhang is the ex officio chairman of Jhang Educational Trust(JET).

The members of the trust are:

 Deputy Commissioner (DC), Jhang (chairman)
 Additional deputy commissioner (revenue), Jhang (vice-chairman)
 Assistant commissioner, Jhang (secretary)
 Justice Manzoor Hussain Sial, former justice of Supreme Court of Pakistan (member)
 Sahibzada Sultan Hameed, former federal secretary, labour and manpower (member)
 Additional deputy commissioner (finance & planning)
 Assistant commissioner, Ahmed Pur Sial (member)
 Assistant commissioner, Shorkot (member)
 Assistant commissioner, Athara Hazari (member)
 CEO, District Education Authority, Jhang (member)
 Deputy director (colleges), Jhang (member)
 Principal, Government Post Graduate College, Jhang (member)

References

External links 
 

Universities and colleges in Jhang District
Intermediate colleges in Pakistan
1991 establishments in Pakistan